Los Angeles City Council District 6 is one of the 15 districts of the Los Angeles City Council, covering much of the central and eastern San Fernando Valley.  The seat is currently vacant due to the resignation of Nury Martinez on October 12, 2022.

Geography

Present-day district

The 6th Council District includes the neighborhoods of North Hollywood, Sun Valley, Van Nuys, Lake Balboa, Panorama City, Pacoima and Arleta.

For all neighborhoods represented in the district, see the official City of Los Angeles map of District 6.

Historical locations

A new city charter effective in 1925 replaced the former "at large" voting system for a nine-member council with a district system with a 15-member council. Each district was to be approximately equal in population, based upon the voting in the previous gubernatorial election; thus redistricting was done every four years. (At present, redistricting is done every ten years, based upon the preceding U.S. census results.) The numbering system established in 1925 for City Council districts began with No. 1 in the north of the city, the San Fernando Valley, and ended with No. 15 in the south, the Harbor area.

As the city expanded to the north and west, the 6th District's boundaries gradually shifted in those directions, but in 2002 the boundaries of the entire district were lifted out of West Los Angeles and transferred to the San Fernando Valley, as was the then-representative, Ruth Galanter, who protested the suddenness of the move.

The earlier boundaries were as follows:

1925: At that time the district encompassed the Hyde Park and Angeles Mesa annexations and Vermont Avenue south to 62nd Street as well as a shoestring strip leading to present-day Westchester, Mines Field and the Hyperion sewage screening plant.

1926: The Exposition Park area.

1928: The boundary ". . . remains as Vermont avenue on the east. The south line runs along Manchester avenue to Van Ness avenue, then the boundary turns north to Slauson Avenue, on which it continues west to Angeles Mesa Drive and then to Exposition boulevard, where it turns east to Arlington avenue. It follows that avenue south to Vermont avenue and goes east on Vernon"

1932–33: ". . . due to the exceptional growth of the western part of the city, a general movement toward the ocean was necessary." East boundary: Vermont. North: Vernon. West: La Brea Avenue. South: Century Boulevard.

1935: Roughly the same as in 1932.

1937: North: Vernon Avenue. East: Vermont Avenue. South: City limits with Inglewood. West: Overhill Avenue.

1940: "The general trend is westward and northeastward, due to heavy construction in the San Fernando Valley and the beach areas." Eastern section remains the same as 1937, but to the district is added the Shoestring Strip north of Inglewood and an area as far west as Sepulveda Boulevard.

1955: ". . . a big jig saw puzzle and stretching from Venice, Playa del Rey and Westchester to Leimert Park."

1960: Venice was lost from the 6th District to the 11th, and Baldwin Hills was shifted to the 6th from 10th.

1969: The Airport area, including Westchester and Playa del Rey, the Baldwin Hills area, including Hyde Park and Leimert Park and the Mar Vista-Venice area.

1975: From the coast inland to the Crenshaw District, and includes Venice, Ocean Park, Westchester and portions of South-Central Los Angeles.

1992: From Venice, Playa del Rey and Westchester east to the Crenshaw District.

2002: Transfer to the east San Fernando Valley, "where a Latino would have a good chance to win."

Officeholders

The district has been represented by six men and three women.

See also
Los Angeles City Council districts
San Fernando Valley
List of Los Angeles municipal election returns

References

Note: Access to most of the Los Angeles Times links requires the use of an LAPL library card.

Notes

External links
 Official Los Angeles City Council District 6 website
 City of Los Angeles: Map of District 6

LACD06
LACD06
Arleta, Los Angeles
Lake Balboa, Los Angeles
LACD06
Panorama City, Los Angeles 
Sun Valley, Los Angeles
Van Nuys, Los Angeles